Anders Wilhelm Krigsman (October 25, 1886 – March 5, 1947) was a Swedish track and field athlete who competed in the 1912 Summer Olympics. In 1912 he finished thirteenth in the two handed javelin throw event and fourteenth in the javelin throw competition.

He was born in Leksand and died in Stockholm.

References

External links
Sports Reference
profile 

1886 births
1947 deaths
People from Leksand Municipality
Swedish male javelin throwers
Olympic athletes of Sweden
Athletes (track and field) at the 1912 Summer Olympics
Sportspeople from Dalarna County